Anugerah Planet Muzik 2009 is the 9th edition of Anugerah Planet Muzik, held on July 18, 2009, for the first time taking place in Indonesia, in the Jakarta Convention Center. It was the first time APM was in Jakarta. There was a bombing at the hotel Ritz-Carlton and JW Marriott Hotels the day before the show, but that did not stop the musicians of Singapore, Malaysia, and Indonesia from continuing to enliven the Anugerah Planet Muzik 2009.

Anugerah Planet Muzik 2009 nominations and winner 
Note: Winners are shown in bold

The best vocals in the best Male Newcomer 
 Afgan - Terima Kasih Cinta
 Aizat - Hanya Kau Yang Mampu
 Dirly - Sampai Ke Ujung Dunia
 LoBow - Kau Cantik Hari Ini
 Nubhan - Ada Untukmu

The best vocals in the best Female Newcomer 
 Aura Kasih - Mari Bercinta
 Ayu - Hanya Di Mercu
 Cinta Laura - Hey Baby!
 Nana - Lafaz
 Stacy - Aku Stacy
 Yuna - Dan Sebenarnya

Best Duo / Group Newcomer 
 d'Masiv - Cinta Ini Membunuhku
 Hello - Ular Berbisa
 Hujan - Pagi Yang Gelap
 Kotak - Beraksi
 ST12 - P.U.S.P.A

Best Collaboration Song 
 Bete - Dewiq Feat. Ipang
 Bersamamu - Malique Feat. Dunia Arif
 Hikayat Cintaku - Glenn Fredly Feat. Dewi Persik *
 KepadaNYA - Taufik Batisah Feat. Hady Mirza
 Mantera Beradu - Malique Feat. M. Nasir
 Sujud - Mawi Feat. KRU

Best Male Singer 
 Afgan - Confession No. 1
 Aizat - Percubaan Pertama
 Reshmonu - Harapan
 Taufik Batisah - Suria Hatiku
 Tompi - My Happy Life

Best Female Singer 
 Bunga Citra Lestari - Tentang Kamu
 Misha Omar - Misha Omar
 Mulan Jameela - Mulan Jameela
 Nikki - Hawa
 Siti Nurhaliza - Lentera Timur

Best Duo / Group 
 Andra & The Backbone - Season 2
 Hujan - Hujan
 Kotak - Kedua
 ST12 - PU.S.PA
 Yovie & Nuno - The Special One

Best Song 
 Dia Milikku - Yovie & Nuno (The Special One)
 Laskar Pelangi - Nidji (Laskar Pelangi Official Soundtrack)
 Matahariku - Agnes Monica (Sacredly Agnezious)
 Pagi Yang Gelap - Hujan (Hujan)
 Terima Kasih Cinta - Afgan (Confession No. 1)
 Terserah - Glenn Fredly (Glenn Fredly Private Collection)

Best Album 
 Confession No. 1 - Afgan
 Hujan - Hujan
 Kedua - Kotak
 Percubaan Pertama - Aizat
 The Special One - Yovie & Nuno

Favourite Singaporean Artist (Based on SMS) 
 Aliff Aziz
 Didicazli
 Fauzie Laily
 Hady Mirza
 Hyrul Anuar
 Imran Ajmain
 Merah
 Nurul Nuwarrah
 Sleeq
 Taufik Bastisah
 The Sallys
 Zaibaktian

Favourite Malaysian Artist (Based on SMS) 
 Aziat
 Anuar Zain
 Bunkface
 Faizal Tahir
 Hujan
 Mawi
 Meet Uncle Hussain
 Misha Omar
 Siti Nurhaliza
 Stacy
 Yuna

Favourite Indonesian Artist (Based on SMS) 
 Afgan
 Agnes Monica
 Bunga Citra Lestari
 d'Masiv
 Gita Gutawa
 Hijau Daun
 Kotak
 Nidji
 ST12
 The Changcuters
 Ungu
 Yovie & Nuno

Most Popular Regional Artist (Artis Serantau Terpopular) 
 Faizal Tahir
 Hujan
 Meet Uncle Hussein
 Siti Nurhaliza
 AhliFiqir
 Aliff Aziz
 Hady Mirza
 Taufik Batisah
 Afgan
 Agnes Monica
 ST12
 Ungu.

Other Anugerah Planet Muzik 2009 winners 
 Most Popular Singaporean Song : Didicazly - Impianku
 Most Popular Malaysian Song : Aizat - Hanya kau yang mampu
 Most Popular Indonesian Song : Slank - Kuil Cinta
 Planet Muzik Humanitarian Award : Dik Doang
 APM Special Award : Gigi

See also 
 Anugerah Planet Muzik
 Anugerah Planet Muzik 2007

References 

Malaysian music awards
Indonesian music awards